Naju O clan was one of the Korean clans. Their Bon-gwan was in Naju, South Jeolla Province. According to the research in 2015, the number of Naju O clan was 18152. He served as government official during Goryeo period and was a descendant of O Cheom who came over from China to Silla during Jijeung of Silla’s reign in Silla dynasty.

See also 
 Korean clan names of foreign origin

References

External links 
 http://www.najuoh.or.kr/
 https://blog.naver.com/najuohorkr
 

 
Korean clan names of Chinese origin